Yevgeniya Bogunova (born 29 September 1974) is a Kazakhstani judoka. She competed in the women's half-heavyweight event at the 1996 Summer Olympics.

References

External links
 

1974 births
Living people
Kazakhstani female judoka
Olympic judoka of Kazakhstan
Judoka at the 1996 Summer Olympics
Place of birth missing (living people)
20th-century Kazakhstani women